Rotaract originally began as a Rotary International youth program in 1968 at Charlotte North Rotary Club in Charlotte, North Carolina, United States, and has grown into a major organization of 10,680 (14 Sep 2022) clubs spread around the world and over 203,000 members in 189 countries. It is a service, leadership, professional and community service organization (often miscommunicated as a Social Service Club) for young men and women aged 18 and over.

Rotaract focuses on the development of young adults as leaders in their communities and workplaces. Clubs around the world also take part in international service projects, in a global effort to bring peace and international understanding to the world.

"Rotaract" stands for "Rotary in Action", although the name originally comes from a combination of "Rotary" and "Interact" (International + Action), the high school level program created by Rotary International in 1962.

Most Rotaract activities take place at the club level. Rotaract clubs hold formal meetings in person or virtually, usually every two weeks, which feature speakers, special outings, social activities, discussions or visits to other clubs. Club members get together on designated days for service project work, social events, or professional/leadership development workshops.

To be eligible for membership, prospective members must be 18 years of age and over, show that they are committed to Rotaract, and show that they are of good standing in the community. After being approved by the club, prospective members are 'inducted' to become members, also known as 'Rotaractors'. 

The avenues of service include Club Service, Community Service, International Service and Professional Development.

Rotaract Club undertake various projects for the overall development of its members and the community.

In 2019, Rotaract went from being a program of Rotary International to being a membership type of Rotary International, elevating its status to resemble that of Rotary clubs. As of 1 July 2020, Rotaract clubs can exist on their own, or may be sponsored by Rotary and/or Rotaract clubs. This makes them true "partners in service" and key members of the family of Rotary.  A Rotaract club may, but is not required to, establish upper age limits, provided that the club (in accordance with its bylaws) obtain the concurrence of its members and the sponsor club(s) (if sponsored).

In Hong Kong, there are 8 U-based universities joint to organize an annual camp for the committee members to participate. The camp is called Interflow.

Multidistrict communication and MDIOs

Rotaract multidistrict information organizations (MDIOs) function as regional resource centers for Rotaries. They comprise Rotaract clubs in two or more districts, within a country or across several countries. MDIOs are formed to disseminate information and facilitate communication among Rotaract clubs in the participating districts.

Rotaract MDIOs are excellent ways for communicating program updates, local and international news, and event bulletins. They also facilitate uniting Rotaries from different clubs and districts within a particular region.

MDIOs offer information in the form of publications, online services, and direct links with Rotary International (RI) staff. The Worldwide Rotaract Directory has information on specific names, districts, and contacts.

References

External links
 
Rotary Wiki, an unofficial wiki project for Rotaractors by Rotaractors.

Rotary International
Youth organizations established in 1968
Youth organizations based in the United States
Organizations based in Illinois